Aubrey Victor "Dit" Clapper (February 9, 1907 – January 20, 1978) was a Canadian professional ice hockey player. Clapper played his entire professional career for the Boston Bruins of the National Hockey League (NHL). He was inducted into the Hall of Fame in 1947, the first Honoured Member to be living at the time of his induction.

Clapper was the first NHL player to play 20 seasons, and one of only two to be an All-Star at both forward and defence.  The right wing on the powerful "Dynamite Line"—one of the first forward combinations to receive a nickname in hockey history—along with linemates Cooney Weiland and Dutch Gainor, he contributed to the breaking of several scoring records in the 1930s. Towards the end of his career, he was named player-coach of the Bruins, and held the coaching position after his retirement as a player.

Early years
Aubrey Clapper, son of Bill Clapper, was raised in Hastings, Ontario. Clapper was given his nickname at an early age when he would lisp his name, the result coming out "Dit."

Clapper started his hockey career at age 13, playing minor hockey in Oshawa, and going on to play with the junior league Toronto Parkdale club of the Ontario Hockey Association in 1925, scoring a goal in the team's Memorial Cup run that season. The following season he turned professional, playing for the Boston Tigers of the Canadian-American Hockey League.

NHL career
The Boston Bruins bought Clapper's contract from the Tigers in 1927. Hitherto a defenceman, Bruins' coach Art Ross decided to try Clapper at right wing, and the experiment stuck. He scored his first NHL goal—ten seconds into his first shift—in the season opener against the Chicago Black Hawks.

The following season, Ross teamed Clapper up with Cooney Weiland and Dutch Gainor to form the renowned Dynamite Line, one of the first named forward lines in history.  The Bruins won the American Division that season and went on to their first Stanley Cup championship, with Clapper scoring the winning goal in the first game of their best-of-three series with the New York Rangers.

In the 1930 season, the league considerably liberalized the passing rules, effectively eliminating offsides. The Stanley Cup champion Bruins took especial advantage, breaking many scoring records and recording the highest winning percentage the league would ever see, unsurpassed as of 2017. Leading the charge was the Dynamite Line, as Weiland led the league in scoring, Clapper finishing third and Gainor finishing ninth; Clapper's goal total of 41 was the third most in league history at that time. The Dynamite Line scored 102 of the Bruins' league record 179 goals, as many as last-place Pittsburgh managed.  While Clapper scored four goals in six playoff games, the Bruins were shocked in the Stanley Cup finals by the Montreal Canadiens in their best-of-three series.

Clapper married Lorraine Pratt of Vancouver in April 1931.

While Clapper kept his production high in the 1931 season, Gainor's scoring fell off badly, and the Dynamite Line was broken up at season's end.  Clapper's 22 goals were good for eighth in the league, and he was named Second team All-Star at right wing at year's end, the first season such All-Stars were named.  The following year Clapper—with Bud Cook replacing the traded Gainor on his line with Weiland—was named team captain and again finished eighth in league scoring, but an injury-riddled Bruins' team fell into last place and out of the playoffs. While Weiland was dealt to Ottawa for the 1933 season, the Bruins purchased Montreal Maroons star Nels Stewart and paired him with Clapper to form a powerful offensive unit that led the Bruins back to a division championship.

The largest forward of his era at 6′2″ and 200 lbs, Clapper was a notably peaceful player who nonetheless was involved in an unusual incident in the 1937 Stanley Cup playoffs against the Montreal Maroons. Highsticking Maroon Dave Trottier twice in the head, referee Clarence Campbell (the future NHL president) called Clapper a profane name, and Clapper knocked the referee to the ice with a single punch. Speculation was heavy that Clapper's punishment would be severe, but Campbell himself pleaded Clapper's case, stating that he felt he had provoked the Bruin into the blow; Clapper received only a $100 fine for the incident.

By 1938, Ross believed the Bruins needed an overhaul, and as part of it asked Clapper to move back to defence. Paired with perennial superstar Eddie Shore on the backline, the move proved highly successful, and Clapper was named a First Team NHL All-Star on defence in 1939, 1940 and 1941, leading the Bruins to Stanley Cup victories in 1939 and 1941.

In February 1942, Clapper suffered a severed tendon in a collision with Toronto player Bingo Kampman and was done for the season. It was feared he would be forced into retirement, but he came back next year and returned to form. During the 1944 season, Clapper broke Hooley Smith's career record for games played, holding the record until Maurice Richard surpassed him in 1957.

Player-coach
During the 1944 season, Clapper filled in as interim coach when Art Ross took ill.  In 1945 Ross retired as Bruins' coach, retaining his general manager's position, and named Clapper as player-coach, the only one in team history.  Clapper retained his team captaincy until his retirement as a player in 1947, ultimately serving as team captain for longer than any NHL player until Ray Bourque surpassed his total in the 1990s.

Retirement and legacy

Hobbled by injuries and with his skills eroded, Clapper originally retired before the start of the 1946–47 season, but returned to play in November 1946 to replace the injured Jack Crawford in the Bruins' lineup.  He played only sporadically thereafter, and retired for good on February 12, 1947. Leading the Bruins to a 10–1 victory over the New York Rangers in his final game (in which Bill Cowley broke the league career scoring record), the Bruins further announced that day that his number #5 sweater would be retired, and the Hockey Hall of Fame immediately inducted him as an Honoured Member.  Clapper was the only active player ever to be inducted into the Hall, and at the time the only living Member inducted.

Of his prowess, Bruins goaltending legend Tiny Thompson said: "Clapper diagnosed the plays like a great infielder in baseball. He put himself where the puck had to come."

Clapper coached the Bruins for two more seasons until, unhappy with the club's performance in the 1949 playoffs against Toronto and uneasy about coaching friends with whom he had played, he resigned.  Save for a single season coaching the American Hockey League's Buffalo Bisons in 1960, in which the team recorded a 33-35-4 record and failed to make the playoffs, he did not again participate in professional hockey.

Clapper ran a plumbing firm and a sporting goods store in Peterborough in retirement, while serving as a director of the Peterborough Petes of the OHA.  He briefly attempted a political career, standing as a Liberal candidate for the Peterborough West riding in the 1949 federal election, losing by fewer than 250 votes to incumbent Progressive Conservative Gordon Fraser.

Clapper died of complications from a 1973 stroke, which had left him confined to a wheelchair, on January 20, 1978. He is buried in Trent Valley Cemetery, Hastings, Ontario.

In 1983, the Bruins signed former Montreal Canadiens star Guy Lapointe, Lapointe sought to wear his customary #5 jersey, which had been retired in Clapper's honour nearly forty years before.  Team general manager Harry Sinden agreed to Lapointe's request, but under protests from Clapper's family, Bruins superstar Bobby Orr and the public, Lapointe was switched to #27 after a handful of games.

On August 11, 2012, former Hockey Hall of Fame coach Scotty Bowman, who was a young Peterborough Petes coach when Clapper served on the club's board of directors, paid tribute to Clapper. The occasion was the unveiling by Clapper's daughter, Marilyn Armstrong, of a new street sign named "Dit Clapper Drive" in Hastings, Ontario.

Achievements and facts
Stanley Cup winner in 1929, 1939, 1941, the most of any Bruins' player in history. 
NHL second All-Star team: 1931, 1935 as a right wing; 1944 as a defenceman
 NHL first All-Star team: 1939, 1940, 1941 all as a defenceman
 Won the Elizabeth C. Dufresne Trophy as most outstanding Bruins player in home games in 1940 and 1941.
 The first player in NHL history to play for 20 seasons, and one of only nine (Alex Delvecchio, George Armstrong, Henri Richard, Jean Béliveau, Ken Daneyko, Nicklas Lidström, Stan Mikita and Steve Yzerman) to do so with the same team.
 The last active NHL position player that played during the 1920s.
 At the time of his retirement, the NHL career leader in games played and seasons played.
 His #5 Jersey was retired by the Boston Bruins in 1947.
 Inducted into the Hockey Hall of Fame in 1947.
 Inducted into Canada's Sports Hall of Fame in 1975.
 In 1998, Clapper was ranked number 41 on The Hockey News''' list of the 100 Greatest Hockey Players of all time. "Clapper had a simple creed," wrote The Hockey News. "He fought his heart out, bounced players around and took the same kind of punishment he dished out. That's what made him so popular with other players and fans throughout the NHL." Mentioned in the hockey cult movie Slap Shot'' with Toe Blake and Eddie Shore as prime examples of "old time hockey."
 Former NHL defenceman Greg Theberge is Dit's grandson.
 His game jersey from the night of his retirement is on display in the International Hockey Hall of Fame's museum in Kingston, Ontario.

Career statistics

Regular season and playoffs

* Stanley Cup Champion.

Coaching record

See also
List of NHL players who spent their entire career with one franchise

References

External links
 
 DIT: Dit Clapper and the Rise of the Boston Bruins by Stewart F. Richardson and Richard J. Leblanc, Paperback: 226 pages, Createspace (July 1, 2012) 

1907 births
1978 deaths
Boston Bruins captains
Boston Bruins coaches
Boston Bruins players
Boston Tigers (CAHL) players
Canadian ice hockey coaches
Canadian ice hockey defencemen
Canadian ice hockey right wingers
Hockey Hall of Fame inductees
Ice hockey people from Ontario
National Hockey League players with retired numbers
Sportspeople from Newmarket, Ontario
People from Northumberland County, Ontario
Stanley Cup champions
Ice hockey player-coaches
Canadian expatriate ice hockey players in the United States